Jedediah Hinkle is an American politician and a Republican member of the Montana House of Representatives. He previously served in the Montana Senate from 2015 to 2019.

In 2021, he supported moving same-day voter registration back one day, to relieve pressure on elections offices while they counted ballots. He testified to individuals being bused in on election day, creating long lines that wrap around the block and being worked by political organizations. The elections office was still registering voters till just before midnight all while a counting machine was broken down. He stated that those who were bussing people to the elections office "were not from our side of the aisle", and such long lines on election night created much stress and strain on the elections department.

References

External links

Living people
Republican Party Montana state senators
People from Sitka, Alaska
Taxidermists
People from Belgrade, Montana
21st-century American politicians
1980 births
Montana State University alumni